Serena Williams was the three-time defending champion, but lost in the fourth round to Svetlana Kuznetsova.

Victoria Azarenka won the title, defeating Kuznetsova in the final, 6–3, 6–2. She became the first woman since Kim Clijsters in 2005 to win Indian Wells and Miami back to back, and became only the third woman in history, after Steffi Graf and Clijsters to complete the 'Sunshine Double' in singles.

Seeds
All seeds received a bye into the second round.

Draw

Finals

Top half

Section 1

Section 2

Section 3

Section 4

Bottom half

Section 5

Section 6

Section 7

Section 8

Qualifying

Seeds

Qualifiers

Qualifying draw

First qualifier

Second qualifier

Third qualifier

Fourth qualifier

Fifth qualifier

Sixth qualifier

Seventh qualifier

Eighth qualifier

Ninth qualifier

Tenth qualifier

Eleventh qualifier

Twelfth qualifier

References
 Main Draw
 Qualifying Draw

Women's Singles
2016 Miami Open – Women's singles